George Duckworth (9 May 1901 – 5 January 1966) was a professional cricketer who played first-class cricket for Lancashire and England.

Duckworth, who won his cricketing fame as a wicket-keeper, was born and died in Warrington, Lancashire, and joined Lancashire in 1922.  He played his first game for the county in 1923 and his last in 1938 and went on to become a member of the Lancashire committee. 1928 was his best season, with him taking 77 catches and 30 stumpings, and this earned him the accolade of being one of the Wisden Cricketers of the Year in 1929. He played 24 Test matches for England, but as a wicket-keeper he was in direct competition in his later years with Les Ames, who was a much better batsman. He was awarded a benefit in 1934, which raised £1,257. He was reputed to have the loudest shout of appeal of any cricketer of his time.

Duckworth's total of 925 dismissals for Lancashire is a record for the county.

After retirement, Duckworth was a journalist and a broadcaster on both cricket and rugby league. He also acted as a cricket tour organiser and as baggage master and scorer on Marylebone Cricket Club (MCC) tours.

A peanut shaped roundabout in his home town Warrington has been named after him.  Duckworth's Roundabout is at Birchwood Way (A574) and Oakwood Gate.

Duckworth was the nephew of the rugby league footballer for Warrington, Jack Duckworth.

References
Cricinfo page on George Duckworth
CricketArchive page on George Duckworth

External links

Citation as Wisden Cricketer of the Year

1901 births
1966 deaths
Cheshire cricketers
Cricketers from Warrington
England Test cricketers
English cricketers of 1919 to 1945
English cricketers
H. D. G. Leveson Gower's XI cricketers
Lancashire cricketers
Marylebone Cricket Club cricketers
North v South cricketers
People educated at Boteler Grammar School
Players cricketers
Wisden Cricketers of the Year
Wicket-keepers
Marylebone Cricket Club Australian Touring Team cricketers
Marylebone Cricket Club South African Touring Team cricketers